Steven Glynn (born March 12, 1988), known professionally as Steve Dangle, is a Canadian sports analyst, author, and internet personality.

Early life and education 
Steven Glynn was born on March 12, 1988, in Toronto. He attended Sir Oliver Mowat Collegiate Institute in Scarborough before graduating from Ryerson University.

Career 
Dangle began his career in 2007, at the age of 19, when he began posting hockey-related content to YouTube. Dangle quickly gained support from fellow Toronto Maple Leafs fans and grew his social media presence.

Dangle is well known for his web series Leafs Fan Reaction, which is often shortened to LFR in which he reacts to every single Maple Leafs game. He also hosts Watch a Leafs Game with Steve Dangle, and has a podcast, The Steve Dangle Podcast, which features him and his childhood friend and fellow analyst, Adam Wylde, alongside Jesse Blake, discussing hockey.

In 2014, Dangle began working for Sportsnet. He started off working behind the scenes until eventually he began hosting hockey events and producing videos for their YouTube channel and website as well as writing articles for them. He also runs the web series Steve's Dang-Its and Steve's Hat-Picks for Sportsnet. On November 22, 2018, Dangle also hosted live television on Sportsnet as a stand-in host on Tim and Sid alongside Sid Seixeiro filling in for regular co-host Tim Micallef.

In 2019, Dangle released a book documenting his life and career titled This Team Is Ruining My Life (But I Love Them): How I Became A Professional Hockey Fan. The book was released to critical praise.

In 2020, Dangle received media coverage after his video reporting on the Leafs losing to the Carolina Hurricanes, who had Toronto Marlies zamboni driver David Ayres as an emergency goaltender, went viral in Canada and the United States.

Personal life 

Dangle and his wife have one child; they live in Ajax.

Written works 

 Glynn, Steve "Dangle" (2019). This Team Is Ruining My Life (But I Love Them): How I Became A Professional Hockey Fan. ISBN: 978-1-77-041444-0

References

External links 
 
 

Ice hockey commentators
1988 births
Living people
Canadian colour commentators
Canadian podcasters
Canadian YouTubers
Twitch (service) streamers
YouTube channels launched in 2007
YouTube channels launched in 2016